Dizziness is an imprecise term that can refer to a sense of disorientation in space, vertigo, or lightheadedness. It can also refer to disequilibrium or a non-specific feeling, such as giddiness or foolishness.

Dizziness is a common medical complaint, affecting 20-30% of persons. Dizziness is broken down into 4 main subtypes: vertigo (~25-50%), disequilibrium (less than ~15%), presyncope (less than ~15%), and nonspecific dizziness (~10%).
 Vertigo is the sensation of spinning or having one's surroundings spin about them. Many people find vertigo very disturbing and often report associated nausea and vomiting.
 Presyncope describes lightheadedness or feeling faint; the name relates to syncope, which is actually fainting.
 Disequilibrium is the sensation of being off balance and is most often characterized by frequent falls in a specific direction.  This condition is not often associated with nausea or vomiting.
 Non-specific dizziness may be psychiatric in origin.  It is a diagnosis of exclusion and can sometimes be brought about by hyperventilation.

Mechanism and causes
Many conditions cause dizziness because multiple parts of the body are required for maintaining balance including the inner ear, eyes, muscles, skeleton, and the nervous system. Thus dizziness can be caused by a variety of problems and may reflect a focal process (such as one affecting balance or coordination) or a diffuse one (such as a toxic exposure or low perfusion state).

Common causes of dizziness include:
 Inadequate blood supply to the brain due to:
 A sudden fall in blood pressure
 Heart problems or artery blockages
 Anaemias, such as Vitamin B12 deficiency anemia, Iron deficiency anemia
 Loss or distortion of vision or visual cues
 Standing too quickly/prolonged standing
 Disorders of the inner ear
 Dehydration
 Distortion of brain/nervous function by medications such as anticonvulsants and sedatives
 Dysfunction of cervical proprioception
 Side effects from other prescription drugs, such as proton-pump inhibitors or Coumadin (warfarin)

Diagnosis

Differential diagnosis
Dizziness may occur from an abnormality involving the brain (in particular the brainstem or cerebellum), inner ear, eyes, heart, vascular system, fluid or blood volume, spinal cord, peripheral nerves, or body electrolytes. Dizziness can accompany certain serious events, such as a concussion or brain bleed, epilepsy and seizures (convulsions), strokes, and cases of meningitis and encephalitis. However, the most common subcategories can be broken down as follows: 40% peripheral vestibular dysfunction, 10% central nervous system lesion, 15% psychiatric disorder, 25% presyncope/disequilibrium, and 10% nonspecific dizziness. Some vestibular pathologies have symptoms that are comorbid with mental disorders.

While traditional medical teaching has focused on determining the cause of dizziness based on the category (e.g. vertigo vs presyncope), recent research suggests that this analysis is of limited clinical utility.

Medical conditions that often have dizziness as a symptom include:
 Benign paroxysmal positional vertigo
 Ménière's disease
 Labyrinthitis
 Otitis media
 Brain tumor
 Acoustic neuroma
 Motion sickness
 Ramsay Hunt syndrome
 Migraine
 Multiple sclerosis
 Pregnancy
 Low blood pressure (hypotension)
 Low blood oxygen content (hypoxemia)
 Heart attack
 Iron deficiency (anemia)
 Vitamin B12 deficiency
 Low blood sugar (hypoglycemia)
 Hormonal changes (e.g. thyroid disease, menstruation, pregnancy)
 Panic disorder
 Hyperventilation
 Anxiety
 Depression
 Age-diminished visual, balance, and perception of spatial orientation abilities
 a stroke is the cause of isolated dizziness in 0.7% of people who present to the emergency department.

Epidemiology
About 20–30% of the population report to have experienced dizziness at some point in 2008.

Disequilibrium

In medicine, disequilibrium refers to impaired equilibrioception that can be characterised as a sensation of impending fall or of the need to obtain external assistance for proper locomotion. It is sometimes described as a feeling of improper tilt of the floor, or as a sense of floating. This sensation can originate in the inner ear or other motion sensors, or in the central nervous system. Neurologic disorders tend to cause constant vertigo or disequilibrium and usually have other symptoms of neurologic dysfunction associated with the vertigo. Many medications used to treat seizures, depression, anxiety, and pain affect the vestibular system and the central nervous system which can cause the symptom of disequilibrium.

See also 

 Balance disorder
 Broken escalator phenomenon
 Chronic subjective dizziness
 Coriolis effect (perception)
 Equilibrioception
 Ideomotor phenomenon
 Illusions of self-motion
 Motion sickness
 Postural orthostatic tachycardia syndrome
 Proprioception
 Seasickness
 Spatial disorientation
 The spins, a state of dizziness and disorientation due to intoxication
 Vertigo

References

External links 

 Dizzytimes.com  Online Community for People with Vertigo and Dizziness
 Dysautonomia Youth Network of America, Inc.

Neurological disorders